Xiejia is a town in Gaoyou, Yangzhou, Jiangsu.  , it has four residential communities and seventeen villages under its administration.

References

Gaoyou
Township-level divisions of Jiangsu